Ower is a hamlet in the New Forest district of Hampshire, England.

Ower lies on the A36 road northwest of Totton. It lies mostly within the civil parish of Copythorne (where the majority of the population was included), although buildings on the east side of the road are in the civil parish of Netley Marsh. It is, however, somewhat cut off from these two parishes by the M27 motorway which passes immediately to the south of the hamlet.

There are two pubs in Ower, called The Mortimer Arms, and The Vine Inn. It also is where the theme park Paultons Park is situated.

References

External links

Hamlets in Hampshire
New Forest